The Palmerin Hotel (also known as the Davis Islands Motor Hotel or Hudson Manor Hotel) is a historic hotel in Tampa, Florida, United States. It is located at 115 East Davis Boulevard. On August 3, 1989, it was added to the U.S. National Register of Historic Places. Today it serves as an assisted living facility for senior citizens.

References

External links

 Hillsborough County listings at National Register of Historic Places
 Hillsborough County listings at Florida's Office of Cultural and Historical Programs

Hotels in Tampa, Florida
National Register of Historic Places in Tampa, Florida
Mediterranean Revival architecture of Davis Islands, Tampa, Florida
1926 establishments in Florida